Henry Yuk is an American actor known for his roles on numerous television shows. Yuk has also frequently appeared in Broadway plays. The son of immigrants from Guangdong, Yuk was born and raised in Brooklyn. After graduating from Midwood High School, he earned a Bachelor of Arts degree in English and education from Brooklyn College.

Filmography

Film

Television

Video games

References 

People from Brooklyn
Male actors from New York City
Brooklyn College alumni
American actors of Chinese descent
Midwood High School alumni
Living people
Year of birth missing (living people)